Lucky Blaze is a 1933 British sports film directed by Widgey R. Newman and starring William Freshman, Vera Sherborne and Moore Marriott. It was made as a quota quickie.

Cast
 William Freshman as Cliff Ellis  
 Vera Sherborne as Rose Benson 
 Moore Marriott as Sir James Benson  
 Freddie Fox as Freddie  
 J. Collins as Collingdean  
 Ian Wilson 
 Harry Rodbourne 
 Jack Walsh 
 Sammy Wregg 
 Micky Beary 
 Ken Robertson
 Buster Rickaby

References

Bibliography
 Chibnall, Steve. Quota Quickies: The Birth of the British 'B' Film. British Film Institute, 2007.
 Low, Rachael. Filmmaking in 1930s Britain. George Allen & Unwin, 1985.
 Wood, Linda. British Films, 1927-1939. British Film Institute, 1986.

External links

1933 films
British horse racing films
1930s sports films
Quota quickies
Films directed by Widgey R. Newman
British black-and-white films
1930s English-language films
1930s British films
English-language sports films